Benjamin John Whishaw (born 14 October 1980) is an English actor and producer. After winning a British Independent Film Award for his performance in My Brother Tom (2001), he was nominated for an Olivier Award for his portrayal of the title role in a 2004 production of Hamlet. This was followed by television roles in Nathan Barley (2005), Criminal Justice (2008) and The Hour (2011–12) and film roles in Perfume: The Story of a Murderer (2006), I'm Not There (2007), Brideshead Revisited (2008), and Bright Star (2009). For Criminal Justice, Whishaw received an International Emmy Award and received his first BAFTA Award nomination.

In 2012, Whishaw played the title role in a BBC Two adaptation of Richard II, broadcast as part of The Hollow Crown series of William Shakespeare adaptations, for which he won the British Academy Television Award for Best Actor. The same year, he appeared as Q in the James Bond film Skyfall (2012), going on to reprise the role in Spectre (2015) and No Time to Die (2021). He has voiced Paddington Bear in Paddington (2014), its sequel Paddington 2 (2017) and the follow-up television series. His other film roles in the 2010s have included Cloud Atlas (2012), The Lobster (2015), Suffragette (2015), The Danish Girl (2015), and Mary Poppins Returns (2018). In 2020, he had a leading role as Patrick "Rabbi" Milligan in the fourth season of the black comedy crime drama Fargo. In 2022, he starred in the BBC medical drama series This Is Going to Hurt.

Whishaw received a third BAFTA Award nomination for the leading role in London Spy (2015) and, for his portrayal of Norman Scott in the miniseries A Very English Scandal (2018), won the British Academy Television Award for Best Supporting Actor, the Golden Globe Award for Best Supporting Actor – Series, Miniseries or Television Film and the Primetime Emmy Award for Outstanding Supporting Actor in a Limited Series or Movie.

Early life 
Whishaw was born on 14 October 1980 in Clifton, Bedfordshire, and was brought up there and in neighbouring Langford. He is the son of Linda (née Hope), who works in cosmetics, and Jose Whishaw who works in sports with young people. He has a fraternal twin, James.

His mother is of English ancestry, while his father is of French, German and Russian descent. The family's original surname was not Whishaw but Stellmacher, a German occupational name for a wheelwright. Whishaw's paternal grandfather, born Jean Vladimir Stellmacher and living in Kassel, Germany changed his name to John Victor Whishaw after World War II during which he served as a British spy in the German army. He was born in Istanbul in 1922 to a Russian mother and German father.

Whishaw was a member of the Bancroft Players Youth Theatre, at Hitchin's Queen Mother Theatre. He attended Henlow Middle School and then Samuel Whitbread Community College in Clifton. He graduated from the Royal Academy of Dramatic Art in 2003.

Career 
Whishaw was involved in many productions with Big Spirit Youth Theatre, including If This Is a Man (also performed as The Drowned & The Saved), a piece devised by the company based on the book of the same name by Primo Levi, a chemist, writer and survivor of Auschwitz concentration camp. It was adapted as a physical theatre piece by the group and taken to the 1995 Edinburgh Festival, where it garnered five-star reviews and great critical acclaim.

As the lead in Trevor Nunn's 2004 production of Hamlet at the Old Vic, Whishaw received highly favourable reviews, was nominated for the Olivier Award for Best Actor and received third prize at the Ian Charleson Awards. The role was shared with Al Weaver in an unusual arrangement. Whishaw played all nights except for Mondays and matinées. Nunn is reported to have made this arrangement due to the youth of the two actors playing the lead, to relieve some of the pressure on each.

His film and television credits include Layer Cake and Chris Morris's 2005 sitcom Nathan Barley, in which he played a character called Pingu. He was named "Most Promising Newcomer" at the 2001 British Independent Film Awards for My Brother Tom. In 2005 he was nominated as best actor in four award programs for his portrayal of Hamlet. He also played Keith Richards in the Brian Jones biopic Stoned. In the spring of 2005, Whishaw received much attention for his role as a drug dealer in the world premiere of Philip Ridley's controversial stage play Mercury Fur.

In Perfume, Whishaw played Jean-Baptiste Grenouille, a perfume maker whose craft turns deadly. The film was released in Germany in September 2006 and in America in December 2006. In the same year, Whishaw worked on Paweł Pawlikowski's abandoned The Restraint of Beasts. Whishaw appeared as one of the Bob Dylan reincarnations in I'm Not There in 2007, in the BBC's Criminal Justice in 2008, in a new adaptation of Brideshead Revisited, and in a stage adaptation of The Idiot at the National Theatre called ...some trace of her.

At the end of 2009 he starred in Cock, a new play by Mike Bartlett at the Royal Court Theatre, about a gay man who falls in love with a woman. In 2009 he also starred as the poet John Keats in the film Bright Star. In February 2010, Whishaw made a successful off-Broadway debut at MCC Theater in the American premiere of the awarding-winning play The Pride by Alexi Kaye Campbell. He played Ariel in Julie Taymor's 2010 film adaptation of The Tempest and was featured in The Hour, a BBC Two drama series.

In 2012 Whishaw appeared as Richard II in the television film Richard II, a part of the BBC Two series The Hollow Crown. He received the British Academy Television Award for Leading Actor. Also in 2012, he appeared as part of the ensemble cast of the science-fiction drama film Cloud Atlas, adapted from the novel of the same name.

Whishaw appeared in the 23rd James Bond film, Skyfall, in the role of Q. He portrayed a younger Q than in previous films; Peter Burton and Desmond Llewelyn both received the role when they were in their forties, while Llewelyn and John Cleese played the role into their eighties and sixties, respectively. In addition, he was teamed a fourth time with Daniel Craig after they starred in the films The Trench, Enduring Love and Layer Cake.

In spring 2013, Whishaw starred on stage alongside Judi Dench in the world premiere of Peter and Alice, a new play by John Logan, inspired by the lives of Alice Liddell and Peter Llewelyn Davies. From October 2013 to February 2014, Whishaw appeared on stage in the revival of Jez Butterworth's play Mojo, also starring Rupert Grint, Brendan Coyle, Daniel Mays and Colin Morgan. He was nominated for a WhatsOnStage Award for Best Actor for both roles. In the summer of 2015 he appeared as Dionysos in Euripides' tragedy Bakkhai at the Almeida Theatre in London.

In 2014, Whishaw starred in the independent film Lilting as well as voicing Paddington Bear in the film Paddington.

In 2015, Whishaw co-starred in The Lobster, a romantic science fiction drama from Greek director Yorgos Lanthimos; appeared in Suffragette, a story of the early feminist movement written by Abi Morgan and also starring Carey Mulligan, Helena Bonham Carter, Meryl Streep and his The Hour co-star, Romola Garai; reprised his role of Q in Spectre, the 24th Bond film, and played author Herman Melville in Ron Howard's In the Heart of the Sea.

In 2017, Whishaw reprised his role as Paddington Bear in Paddington 2. In 2018, he portrayed Norman Scott in the BBC One miniseries A Very English Scandal, opposite Hugh Grant as parliamentarian Jeremy Thorpe, and also starred as Michael Banks in Mary Poppins Returns. In 2020, Whishaw had a lead role in the fourth season of the critically acclaimed FX black comedy crime drama Fargo, portraying Patrick "Rabbi" Milligan, alongside Chris Rock, Jason Schwartzman, Jessie Buckley and Jack Huston.

Whishaw reprised his role of Q in No Time to Die, the 25th James Bond film, which released worldwide on 30 September 2021. As of 2022, Whishaw stars in the BBC and AMC medical drama This Is Going to Hurt, an adaptation of comedian Adam Kay's memoir recalling his time as a junior NHS doctor in 2006. Whishaw is also credited as an executive producer. He has an upcoming role in Sarah Polley's Women Talking, a film adaptation of Miriam Toews' novel of the same name.

He will portray Russian writer and ultranationalist Eduard Limonov in Limonov, the Ballad of Eddie, directed by Kirill Serebrennikov.

Trivia 
Whishaw's regular dubbing voice for the French-speaking world is Yoann Sover who has dubbed his performances in 7 films and 4 tv series as of 2021.

Personal life 
For several years, Whishaw refused to answer questions about his personal life, saying: "For me, it's important to keep a level of anonymity. As an actor, your job is to persuade people that you're someone else. So if you're constantly telling people about yourself, I think you're shooting yourself in the foot." In 2011, he told Out magazine: "As an actor you have total rights to privacy and mystery, whatever your sexuality, whatever you do. I don't see why that has to be something you discuss openly because you do something in the public eye. I have no understanding of why we turn actors into celebrities."

Whishaw entered into a civil partnership with Australian composer Mark Bradshaw in August 2012. In 2014, he publicly discussed his coming out, saying that it was a tense experience for him but "everyone was surprisingly lovely".

Acting credits

Film

Television

Theatre

Radio

Awards and nominations

See also 
 List of British actors
 List of Royal National Theatre Company actors
 List of Royal Academy of Dramatic Art alumni

References

External links 

 
 
 
 
 

1980 births
Living people
English twins
People from Central Bedfordshire District
British people of English descent
English people of French descent
English people of German descent
English people of Russian descent
Alumni of RADA
Male actors from Bedfordshire
English male stage actors
English male Shakespearean actors
English male television actors
English male film actors
English male voice actors
English gay actors
Best Supporting Actor BAFTA Award (television) winners
International Emmy Award for Best Actor winners
Outstanding Performance by a Supporting Actor in a Miniseries or Movie Primetime Emmy Award winners
Best Supporting Actor Golden Globe (television) winners
Theatre World Award winners
Sundance Film Festival award winners
21st-century English LGBT people